Unione Sportiva Cremonese, commonly referred to as Cremonese, is an Italian football club based in Cremona, Lombardy, which plays in the .

History

Cremonese was in the Serie A in its first season, 1929–30, but entered a long period of decline, languishing in the lower leagues before the late 1970s. By 1984, they had achieved promotion to Serie A, with one-year spells in 1984–85, 1989–90 and 1991–92.

Cremonese had a successful run in the 1992–93 Anglo-Italian Cup, beating Bari 4–1 in the semi-final, and Derby County 3–1 in the final at the old Wembley Stadium, Cremonese's scorers were Corrado Verdelli, Riccardo Maspero and Andrea Tentoni, with Derby's goal scored by Marco Gabbiadini.

Under Luigi Simoni, Cremonese returned to Serie A in the 1993–94 season. With a side containing quality in the form of defenders Luigi Gualco and Corrado Verdelli, midfield playmaker Riccardo Maspero and forwards Andrea Tentoni and Matjaž Florijančič, Cremonese held their own in Serie A with a 10th-place finish in 1993–94, but would be relegated in the 1995–96 season.

Relegation resulted in the decline of the club, plummeting to Serie C2 by 2000, before achieving successive promotions back to Serie B by 2005. Giovanni Dall'Igna, another defender from the Serie A years, returned to the club. However, Cremonese were relegated to Serie C1 in the 2005–06 season. Cremonese have tried to return to Serie B since: they had a good attempt in the 2009–10 season, when they were beaten by Varese in the promotion play-off final (2–1 on aggregate). Eventually they succeeded in 2017. In the 2021–22 Serie B, Cremonese finished second to earn promotion to the 2022–23 Serie A. Despite achieving promotion, coach Fabio Pecchia resigned from his post.

Players

Current squad

Out on loan
.

Former players

Some of the famous players who played for Cremonese include:

  Antonio Cabrini
  Enrico Chiesa
  Giovanni Dall'Igna
  Giuseppe Favalli
  Riccardo Maspero
  Michelangelo Rampulla
  Corrado Verdelli
  Gianluca Vialli
  Pasquale Vivolo
  Gustavo Dezotti
  John Aloisi
  Juary
  Władysław Żmuda
  Matjaž Florijančič
  Anders Limpar

Coaching staff

Honours

Divisional movements

References

External links
 
Profile at Serie B 

 
1903 establishments in Italy
Association football clubs established in 1903
Football clubs in Italy
Football clubs in Lombardy
Italian football First Division clubs
Serie A clubs
Serie B clubs
Serie C clubs
Serie D clubs